Crucisternum is a Neotropical genus of water scavenger beetle in the family Hydrophilidae represented by seven described species known from the Guiana Shield Region.

Taxonomy 
The genus Crucisternum was described for the first time by Girón & Short in 2018.

It belongs in the subfamily Acidocerinae and contains seven described species from Brazil (Minas Gerais, Pará), French Guiana, Guyana, Suriname, and Venezuela.

Description 
Small beetles (2.0–2.5 mm), smooth and shiny dorsally, orange-brown to dark brown in coloration, with long maxillary palps. The most salient characteristic of the genus is the presence of a longitudinal carina on the prosternum, which is accompanied by a cruciform elevation on the mesoventrite. A complete diagnosis was presented by Girón and Short.

Habitat 
According to Girón and Short "All species of the genus are associated with forested streams, usually along margins that contain ample detritus".

Species 

 Crucisternum escalera Girón and Short, 2018
 Crucisternum ouboteri Girón and Short, 2018
 Crucisternum queneyi Girón and Short, 2018
 Crucisternum sinuatus Girón and Short, 2018
 Crucisternum toboganensis Girón and Short, 2018
 Crucisternum vanessae Girón and Short, 2018
 Crucisternum xingu Girón and Short, 2018

References 

Hydrophilidae
Insects of South America
Insects described in 2018